Merovech (411 – 458) was the King of the Salian Franks, which later became the dominant Frankish tribe, and the founder of the Merovingian dynasty. Several legends and myths surround his person. He is proposed to be one of several barbarian warlords and kings that joined forces with the Roman general Aetius against the Huns under Attila at the Battle of the Catalaunian Plains in Gaul in 451. His grandson Clovis I became the founder of the Frankish kingdom.

The family of Childeric and Clovis, the first Frankish large-scale royal dynasty called themselves Merovingians ("descendants of Meroveus") after him, and this was known to historians in the following centuries, but no more contemporary evidence exists. The most important such written source, Gregory of Tours, recorded that Merovech was said to be descended from Chlodio, a roughly contemporary Frankish warlord who pushed from the Silva Carbonaria in modern central Belgium as far south as the Somme, north of Paris in modern-day France.

Name

The name Merovech is related to Marwig,  (compare modern Dutch  "news, rumour",  "famous" as well as  "fight" with -vech).

Historical accounts
There is little information about him in the later histories of the Franks. Gregory of Tours only names him once as the father of Childeric I but remained vague about his relationship to Chlodio. The Chronicle of Fredegar recounts that Merovech was born after Chlodio's wife encountered a sea creature while bathing in the sea; according to Fredegar it remained unclear whether Merovech's father was the creature or Chlodio. Another theory considers this legend to be the creation of a mythological past needed to back up the fast-rising Frankish rule in Western Europe.

Chlodio is said to have been defeated by Flavius Aëtius at Vicus Helena in Artois in 448. Ian S. Wood would therefore place his son somewhere in the second half of the fifth century.

A contemporary Roman historian, Priscus writes of having witnessed in Rome a “lad without down on his cheeks as yet and with fair hair so long that it poured down his shoulders, Aetius had made him his adopted son”. Priscus writes that the excuse Attila used for waging war on the Franks was the death of their king and the disagreement of his children over the succession, the elder being allied with Attila and the younger with Aetius. As Chlodio died just before Attila's invasion, this seems to suggest that Merovech was in fact Chlodio's son.

References in popular culture
The legend about Merovech's conception was adapted in 1982 by Michael Baigent, Richard Leigh and Henry Lincoln in their book The Holy Blood and the Holy Grail, as the seed of a new idea. They hypothesized that this "descended from a fish" legend was actually referring to the concept that the Merovingian line had married into the bloodline of Jesus Christ, since the symbol for early Christians had also been a fish.  This theory, with no other basis than the authors' hypothesis, was further popularized in 2003 via Dan Brown's bestselling novel, The Da Vinci Code. However, there was no evidence for this claim that Merovech is descended from Jesus. The identity and historicity of Merovech is one of the driving mysteries in The Widow’s Son, second book of Robert Anton Wilson’s The Historical Illuminatus Chronicles, first introducing the fish legend to the reader by having the early Merovingians appear in a vision as a hideous fish creature resembling H. P. Lovecraft’s Deep Ones, before settling on a variation on Holy Blood, Holy Grail which goes a step further by identifying Jesus and Mary Magdalene as the bridegroom and bride in The Alchemical Marriage of Christian Rosycross and Merovech as the titular Widow's Son from Masonic lore and positing that the entire bloodline is descended from alien-human hybrids.

See also
Battle of the Catalaunian Plains
Tonantius Ferreolus (prefect)

Notes

References
 Behind the Da Vinci Code, 2006, History Channel documentary about Henry Lincoln
 Todd, M. The Early Germans
 Wood, Ian. The Merovingian Kingdoms 450–751. London: Longman Group, 1994.

External links 
 

 
 

Frankish warriors
Merovingian kings
410s births
450s deaths
5th-century Frankish people
5th-century monarchs in Europe
Year of birth unknown
Founding monarchs
People whose existence is disputed
Legendary monarchs